Daniel McCay is an American politician and a Republican member of the Utah Senate representing District 18. Prior to redistricting he represented District 11. He was in the Utah House of Representatives representing District 41 from 2013 through 2018. McCay was initially appointed by Republican Governor of Utah Gary Herbert to fill the vacancy caused by the resignation of Carl Wimmer.

Political career
Redistricted to District 41, and with incumbent Republican Representative Todd Kiser leaving the Legislature and leaving the seat open, McCay was chosen from two candidates by the Republican convention and was unopposed for the November 6, 2012 General election, winning with 13,658 votes.

McCay was unopposed for the June 24, 2014 Republican Primary and won the November 4, 2014 General election with 6,685 votes (70.5%) against Democratic nominee Colleen Bliss.

During the 2016 legislative session, McCay served on the Higher Education Appropriations Subcommittee, the House Education Committee, and the House Revenue and Taxation Committee. During the interim, McCay serves on the Education Interim Committee and the Revenue and Taxation Interim Committee. He also works on the Legislative Information Technology Steering Committee and the Utah Tax Review Commission.

In 2020, McCay sponsored a bill that bans abortions for any reason besides rape, incest, or the mother’s health that goes into effect automatically if Roe v. Wade is overturned.

Personal life
McCay lives in Riverton, Utah with his wife, Tawnee, and their six young children. McCay is a vice president at Suburban Land Reserve.

References

External links
Campaign site
Dan McCay at Ballotpedia
Dan McCay at the National Institute on Money in State Politics

Place of birth missing (living people)
Year of birth missing (living people)
Living people
Republican Party members of the Utah House of Representatives
People from Riverton, Utah
Utah State University alumni
Willamette University College of Law alumni
21st-century American politicians